Sholes may refer to:

 Sholes, Nebraska, a US village
 Motorola Droid, an Android-based smartphone by Motorola, previously publicized under the codenames Sholes and Tao and the model number A855.

People with the surname
 Charles Sholes (Wisconsin politician), American politician
 Christopher Latham Sholes, American inventor of one of the early typewriters
 Stephen H. Sholes, American recording executive and musician

See also 
Scholes (disambiguation)
Shoal